Børge Christensen (18 May 1912 – 4 August 1967) was a Danish sports shooter. He competed in the 50 m rifle event at the 1948 Summer Olympics.

References

1912 births
1967 deaths
Danish male sport shooters
Olympic shooters of Denmark
Shooters at the 1948 Summer Olympics
Sportspeople from Copenhagen
20th-century Danish people